Tranzit may refer to:

FC Tranzit, a football club in Latvia
 In Tranzit, original title of the 2008 Russian-British film In Transit
Tranzit Group, a bus operator in New Zealand
 TranZit, a map of zombies in Call of Duty: Black Ops II
a bar at the No Sleep Festival in Serbia